Lee Jong-kul (born 22 May 1957) is a South Korean politician. He has a bachelor's degree in law from Seoul National University. He is currently a member of the National Assembly and was the floor leader of The Minjoo Party of Korea. He is proud of his grandfather Lee Hoe-yeong as he devoted himself to fighting Japanese colonialists.

References

External links
Official website 

Members of the National Assembly (South Korea)
Minjoo Party of Korea politicians
20th-century South Korean lawyers
Seoul National University alumni
Kyunggi High School alumni
People from Seoul
1957 births
Living people